Mongol invasion of Poland may refer to:
First Mongol invasion of Poland, 1240–1241
Second Mongol invasion of Poland, 1259–1260
Third Mongol invasion of Poland, 1287–1288